Patricia Duggan (12 October 1937 – 20 June 2015) was an Australian sprinter. She competed in the women's 100 metres at the 1960 Summer Olympics.

References

1937 births
2015 deaths
Athletes (track and field) at the 1960 Summer Olympics
Australian female sprinters
Olympic athletes of Australia
Sportspeople from Rockhampton
Olympic female sprinters